Mylopotas is a small settlement located on the Greek island of Ios. Although the population of Mylopotas is just 120 people, during the summer season many tourists visit Mylopotas to enjoy the beach and stay in one of the resorts nearby. Also in Mylopotas there are many night clubs and a lot of young tourists pass their time there.

Name
The name of Mylopotas comes from a stream with the same name. This stream runs through Mylopotas, and its name literally means the river (potas<potamos) of the mills (mylo<myls), because the stream starts from the Mills of Chora. In older references and in Katharevousa, the settlement is called Mylopotamos.

Beach of Mylopotas
The beach of Mylopotas is the largest in area and length beach of Ios island. It is an organized beach and it is less than 40 meters away from Mylopotas' restaurants and cafeterias.

References

Populated places in Ios